Frank Alexander (born December 17, 1989) is a former American football defensive end. He played college football at the University of Oklahoma. He was drafted by the Carolina Panthers in the fourth round of the 2012 NFL Draft.

Professional career

Carolina Panthers
Alexander was selected by the Carolina Panthers in the fourth round, with the 103rd overall pick, of the 2012 NFL Draft. He made his NFL debut in Week 1 against the Tampa Bay Buccaneers as a backup defensive end.

On May 5, 2014, Alexander was suspended 4 games for violating the NFL's substance abuse policy. Shortly before that suspension was scheduled to end, he was suspended for 10 more games for another violation.

In the second preseason game against the Miami Dolphins, Alexander suffered a torn Achilles tendon. He was waived/injured on August 25, 2015. He cleared waivers and was reverted to the Panthers' injured reserve list. On November 24, 2015, the NFL announced that Alexander would be suspended for a year for his third violation with marijuana.

In the 2015 season, Alexander's Panthers reached Super Bowl 50 on February 7, 2016. The Panthers fell to the Denver Broncos by a score of 24–10.

BC Lions
On March 7, 2017 Alexander and the BC Lions of the Canadian Football League agreed to a contract.

Dallas Renegades
In 2019, Alexander was selected by the Dallas Renegades in the 2020 XFL Draft. He had his contract terminated when the league suspended operations on April 10, 2020.

Career stats

References

External links
 
 Carolina Panthers bio
 Oklahoma Sooners bio

1989 births
Living people
American football defensive ends
Players of Canadian football from Louisiana
BC Lions players
Canadian football defensive linemen
Carolina Panthers players
Dallas Renegades players
Oklahoma Sooners football players
People from Zachary, Louisiana
Sportspeople from Baton Rouge, Louisiana
Players of American football from Louisiana